Halavan-e Pain (also Romanized as Halavān-e Pā’īn; also known as Halavān and Halvīān) is a village in Seh Hezar Rural District, Khorramabad District, Tonekabon County, Mazandaran Province, Iran. At the 2006 census, its population was 20, in 4 families.

References 

Populated places in Tonekabon County